The Day of Saint Peter and Saint Fevronia ( / ) also known as the Day of Family, Love and Faithfulness ( / ), the Orthodox patrons of marriage, was officially introduced in Russia in 2008. Svetlana Medvedeva is among the most active promoters of the new holiday. Its symbol is a white daisy.

History 
The Day of Saints Peter and Fevronia since the days of Kievan Rus and until 1917, was broadly celebrated in Russia because it is believed that the Saints Peter and Fevronia are the patrons of marriage and family, as well as the symbols of love and fidelity. On this day it was common to go to church, where the people asked for love and family grace.
 
The Tale of Peter and Fevronia of Murom (which literary treatment relates to the period of the mid-16th century), Duke Peter was the second son of Duke Yuri Vladimirovich of Murom. He ascended the throne in 1203. A few years before Peter’s principality he became seriously ill that no one could cure him. One day the duke had a dream that he could be healed by a peasant girl, named Fevronia.
 
Fevronia (Greek Φεβρωνία) was beautiful, pious and good, plus she was a wise woman, she knew the properties of herbs and could cure ailments. Fevronia promised the prince that she could indeed cure him, but she said that he must also marry her.  Since she was a commoner, the prince  believed that he could not do such a thing because of his noble status, but he desperately wanted to be cured, so he vowed to marry her after the healing. The girl cured the duke, but he went back on his promise and did not marry her. The disease came back, this time even worse, and, humbled by this situation he returned to Fevronia, and Fevronia cured him once again. This time the duke married the girl.

This marriage was marked by Peter and Fevronia's profoundly deep love for one another, which they nourished by God's grace for their whole lives.
 
After the death of his brother Peter inherited the throne. The nobles (or boyars) respected his duke, but the haughty nobles’ wives disliked Fevronia, not wanting to be ruled by the peasant. The nobles demanded that the duke leave her. Peter, after he heard of the intentions of separating him from the beloved wife, chose to voluntarily relinquish the power and wealth and go with her in exile. So Peter and Fevronia left Murom.
 
Soon the unrest began in Murom, nobles were quarreling, fighting for the throne. Then they came around, gathered a council and invited the duke and his wife back. The duke and duchess returned and Fevronia managed to earn the love of the urban counterparts. They ruled after that long and happily.
 
In his declining years, Peter and Fevronia took the vows in various monasteries and asked God to die in one day. They bequeathed to bury them in a specially prepared coffin with a thin partition in the middle.
 
Peter and Fevronia died, each in his or her own cell, on the same day and hour - on 8 July 1228. But people wickedly refused to honor their request to be buried in one coffin and they broke the will of the dead: their bodies were placed in the different realms. But the very next day they were found together. Twice their bodies were carried out to the different churches, but twice they miraculously were found side by side. And the spouses were buried together in the city of Murom at the cathedral church of the Nativity of the Blessed Virgin.
 
Since that time the history of the spouses of Peter and Fevronia is the embodiment of the unquenchable love and loyalty and every year on 8 July the Eastern Orthodox Church celebrates the memory of Saints Peter and Fevronia.

Controversy
The two saints feast day is like the Orthodox antipodes of the Catholic Church feast of couples in love – Saint Valentine. Part of Saint Valentine’s relics was deposited in the Cathedral of Christ the Saviour in Moscow several years ago, during the life of late Patriarch Alexiy II.

According to a recent opinion poll, Saint Valentine's Day has become  popular among Russians, yet this holiday has more opponents than supporters. Some Russians said's “our culture does not benefit from foreign holidays” or "it is a commercial holiday: not for people but for merchants".

According to sociological data, the demand for flowers, souvenirs and perfume in Russia grows by almost 15% ahead of All Lovers’ Day. At the same time, statistics shows that the number of those who mark All Lovers’ Day becomes smaller every year. This may be explained by the fact that the Russian Orthodox Church introduced its own lovers’ day in 2008.

References
 "История древнерусской литературы". Курс лекций; compiled by В.В. Кусков, 2 ed., Высшая школа, — М.: 1966. pp. 139–143.
 "Повесть о Петре и Февронии Муромских в её отношении к русской сказке. Скрипиль М.О. ТОДРЛ vol. 7 М. — Л. 1949.
 Православие и праздник 8 июля
 Всероссийский день семьи, любви и верности
 Russia marks the Day of Family, Love and Faithfulness
 Russians Still Can't Decide About St. Valentine's Day

See also 

Saints Peter and Fevronia of Murom
The Tales of Peter and Fevronia
Christian views on marriage
International Day of Families
Valentine's Day

Saints days
Observances in Russia
Love
Slavic holidays
July observances
Summer events in Russia
Days celebrating love